Cutback or Cutbacks may refer to:
 Cutback technique, a destructive technique for determining certain optical fiber transmission characteristics
 Cutback (surfing move)
 Cutback (roller coaster), a roller coaster inversion similar to a corkscrew
 Cutback (football move), a sudden change in direction by a ball carrier in American football
 "Cutbacks" (30 Rock), an episode of 30 Rock